Give Blood is the second studio album by American hardcore punk band Bane, released in 2001. Lyrically, it focuses on the hardcore scene, as well as themes of dreams and loss.

Track listing
"Speechless" – 1:24
"Some Came Running" – 2:37
"Snakes Among Us" – 3:58
"Release the Hounds" – 2:39
"What Holds Us Down" – 1:17
"Ante Up" – 2:37
"Bang the Drum Slowly" – 2:18
"Sunflowers and Sunsets" – 3:17
"The Big Gun Down" – 2:44
"Ali v. Frazier I" – 2:45

Personnel
 Aaron Bedard – vocals
 Aaron Dalbec – guitar
 Zach Jordan – guitar
 Pete Chilton – bass
 Nick Branigan – drums

References

External links

2001 albums
Bane (band) albums
Equal Vision Records albums